Stedman-Ghee Rivett Gans (born 19 March 1997) is a South African rugby sevens player for the South Africa national team and a rugby union player for the  in the United Rugby Championship and the  in the Currie Cup. He usually plays as a centre or a winger.

Rugby career

2013–2015: Schoolboy rugby

Gans was born in Vredenburg. He attended primary school in the town, before moving to Pretoria to attend Hoërskool Waterkloof. In 2013, he played for them at the Under-16 Grant Khomo Week held in Vanderbijlpark, before representing them at South Africa's premier high schools competition, the Under-18 Craven Week in both 2014 and 2015. He scored one try in the 2014 event held in Middelburg, in a 21–10 victory over the Golden Lions, and repeated the feat in the 2015 event in Stellenbosch, scoring a try against Western Province in a 13–20 defeat. He caught the eye of the national selectors and was named in the 2015 South Africa Schools squad for the Under-18 International Series. He scored two tries in their match against Wales in the first match of the series, helping his team to a 42–11 victory, and also helped them to wins over France and England.

2016: UP Tuks, South Africa Under-20 and Blue Bulls Under-19

He made just one appearance in their final match of the competition, starting on the right wing in a 19–49 defeat to Argentina in the third-place play-off match.

He returned to domestic action, starting six matches for the  team in the 2016 Under-19 Provincial Championship. He helped his team finish second on the log to qualify for the play-offs, but could not prevent his side being eliminated at the semi-final stage, losing 24–34 to the Golden Lions.

2017: South Africa Sevens

Gans joined the South Africa Sevens' Academy at the end of 2016, played for the team at the 2016 Dubai Sevens. In February 2017, he was named as an official reserve for the national sevens team for the 2017 USA Sevens tournament, and a week later, an injury to Justin Geduld saw him promoted to the main squad for the 2017 Canada Sevens in Vancouver.

He was again named in a South Africa Under-20 training squad for 2017.

Honours
 Springbok Sevens Player of the Year 2020 
 Super Rugby Unlocked 2020

References

External links 
 

South African rugby union players
Living people
1997 births
People from Saldanha Bay Local Municipality
Rugby union centres
Rugby union wings
South Africa international rugby sevens players
Bulls (rugby union) players
Blue Bulls players
Rugby sevens players at the 2020 Summer Olympics
Olympic rugby sevens players of South Africa